José Quiroga is a cardiologist who served as a physician to Chilean president Salvador Allende. During the 1973 Chilean coup d'état, Quiroga witnessed the Chilean Army assault the government palace. He was detained and beaten until his release was ordered by a Chilean military general.

Career

In 1977, Quiroga secured a position at UCLA Fielding School of Public Health and moved his family to Santa Monica, California. He volunteered to treat torture victims at UCLA and the Venice Family Clinic for the next twenty-five years. In 1980, Quiroga co-founded the Program for Torture Victims with Argentine refugee psychologist Ana Deutsch. He has spoken about his work at conferences and universities worldwide. 

Quiroga was the former vice president and member of the executive committee of the International Rehabilitation Council for Torture Victims (IRCT) in Copenhagen. He also serves as treasurer of Physicians for Social Responsibility and was a former medical director of the Program for Torture Victims. He received the 2009 Socially Responsible Medicine Award from Physicians for Social Responsibility in recognition of his professional career and social commitment. Quiroga was awarded the Inge Genefke Award in 2012 alongside his peer Jim Jaranson. The award is given every other year by the Anti-Torture Support Foundation to honor outstanding work in the global fight against torture. The official award ceremony took place in November 2012 at the board meeting of the International Rehabilitation Council for Torture Victims.

For his work on the human rights of refugees, Quiroga has received press coverage from the Los Angeles Times Magazine the New South Wales Service for the Treatment and Rehabilitation of Torture and Trauma Survivors' Refugee Transitions. In an interview with the Hungarian journal Élet és Irodalom, he further commented on his founding of the Program for Torture Victims and how its relationships with the IRCT drew closer following the Balkan Wars.

Publications

Author

Co-author

References

External links
Program for Torture Victims

Living people
Year of birth missing (living people)
Chilean cardiologists
UCLA School of Public Health faculty
Chilean emigrants to the United States